The Irgina is a river in Perm Krai and Sverdlovsk Oblast, Russia, a left tributary of the Sylva, which in turn is a tributary of the Chusovaya. Main tributaries: Shurtan (left), Turysh (right).

References 

Rivers of Perm Krai
Rivers of Sverdlovsk Oblast